Come on Sister is an EP from the indie pop band Belle & Sebastian released in 2011. It was released by Rough Trade records.

Artwork
The cover features Katie Alcock photographed by Stuart Murdoch.

Track listing

 "Come on Sister (Tony Doogan mix)
 "I Didn't See It Coming (Richard X remix)
 "I Didn't See It Coming (Cold Cave mix)
 "Blue Eyes of a Millionaire"

Charts

References 

http://www.belleandsebastian.com/recordings/come-on-sister-12

Belle and Sebastian EPs
2011 EPs
Rough Trade Records EPs